Several vessels have been named Prince.

 , of 52, or 56, or 70 tons (bm), was launched in 1785 at Liverpool, for the slave trader John Dawson. She first appeared in Lloyd's Register (LR), in the issue for 1786 with Molineux, master, Dawson, owner, and trade Liverpool–Africa. Initially she may have served as a feeder vessel, trading slaves on the African coast but without making the Middle Passage, i.e., without carrying captives from Africa to the West Indies. In 1790, Prince, James Hunter, master made her first enslaving voyage in the triangular trade. In 1790–1791 she made a second enslaving voyage. In 1791, Prince, Thomas Nixon, master, made a third enslaving voyage. She was lost in late 1792 or in 1793 homeward bound after she had landed her captives at Kingston, Jamaica. 
  was launched at Bristol in 1785 as Alexander and then made two complete voyages as a slave ship in the triangular trade in enslaved people. Her owners changed her name to Prince in 1787. As Prince, she made six more complete voyages as an enslaving ship. She sailed on enslaving voyages for owners in Bristol, Liverpool, and London. She foundered in 1800 as she was returning to England from her ninth, having delivered captives to Jamaica.

See also
  – one of six vessels of the Royal Navy of that name

Citations

References
 

Ship names